Kordabad (also Romanized as Kordābād) is a village in Talkh Ab Rural District, Khenejin District, Farahan County, Markazi Province, Iran. At the 2006 census, its population was 13, in 6 families.

References 

Populated places in Farahan County